Martin Gruber (born November 11, 1975 in Brixen) is an Italian luger who has competed since 1992. A natural track luger, he won the men's singles silver medal at the 1998 FIL World Luge Natural Track Championships in Rautavaara, Finland.

Gruber also won a silver medal in the same event at the 1995 FIL European Luge Natural Track Championships in Kandalaksha, Russia.

References
FIL-Luge profile
Natural track European Championships results 1970-2006.
Natural track World Championships results: 1979-2007

External links
 

1975 births
Living people
Italian lugers
Italian male lugers
Sportspeople from Brixen